Radio Dobre Vibracije (Croatian for "good vibes") is a Herzegovinian commercial radio station, broadcasting from Mostar, Bosnia and Herzegovina.

Radio Dobre Vibracije was launched on 16 December 1996.

Frequencies
The program is currently broadcast at 4 frequencies:

 Mostar  
 Čapljina  
 Drežnica 
 Grude

References

External links 
 www.rdv.ba
 Communications Regulatory Agency of Bosnia and Herzegovina
 Radio Dobre Vibracije page on Facebook

See also 
List of radio stations in Bosnia and Herzegovina

Mostar
Radio stations established in 1996
Mass media in Mostar